The Nissan Nuvu is a compact all-electric city car with 2+1 seating, with solar panels shaped like tree leaves on the roof that channel the sun's power through a "tree trunk" conduit in the center of the vehicle.

More information

Nissan's vision for the future of urban transportation is encapsulated in Nuvu, literally a 'new view' of the type of car we will be driving in the middle of the next decade. Compact – it's just 3 metres long – Nuvu is a concept vehicle with unique 2+1 seating. It is aimed at urban dwellers who don't want to compromise on their personal freedom or their comfort, yet who appreciate that there is a need for a dramatic change in the way we move around our cities.

Nuvu is an electric vehicle, is agile, easy to drive and even easier to park. It represents Nissan's commitment to electric vehicle technology, considering that Nissan has already announced that it will present a production-ready EV at the 2009 Tokyo Motor Show, with sales due to start in Japan and North America in 2010. Whilst Nuvu is not that car, it does share some of the technology that will feature in the planned production vehicle.

The vehicle shown at Paris Motor Show incorporates a witty representation of its green credentials: across its all-glass roof are a dozen or so small solar panels. Shaped like leaves on a branch, the power they generate is fed to the battery using a 'tree trunk' within the car as a conduit. Nuvu also uses natural, organic and recycled materials within the cabin.

Nuvu is compact on the outside yet roomy on the inside. Built on a unique platform, it's just 3 metres long and sits on a wheelbase of 1980 mm but is 1700 mm tall and 1550 mm wide to create a large and airy cabin.

These dimensions provide all the interior room needed for the vast majority of city journeys. Nuvu has two regular seats and a third occasional chair that can be folded down when required. But, unlike some two-seater city cars currently on the market, it is a thoroughly practical proposition with an integral luggage area providing sufficient space for a typical supermarket or shopping expedition.

"Nuvu is a concept car, for sure, but it is an entirely credible vehicle," says Francois Bancon, General Manager, Exploratory and Advanced Planning Department, Product Strategy and Product Planning Division, Nissan Motor Co., Ltd.

"It is light, clean and easy to drive. It is practical and a sensible size, yet it also embodies an element of fun: the future doesn't look so bad, after all."

See also 
Nissan Motors

References

External links 

http://www.nissan.co.jp/EN/LINEUP/lineup_24.html

Electric city cars
Nissan concept vehicles